Critical Keertanegalu is a 2022 Indian Kannada-language comedy drama film directed by Kumaar. It stars Tabla Nani, Suchendra Prasad, Rajesh Nataranga, Taranga Vishwa, Apoorva, Aruna Balraj are in the lead roles. The Music composed by Veer Samarth . Cinematography done by Shiva Seena & Shiva Shankar and it is edited by Vishwa Vijeth. The film is produced by Kumar L under Kesari Films Capture banners.

Cast
 Tabla Nani
 Suchendra Prasad
 Rajesh Nataranga
 Taranga Vishwa
 Apoorva Bharadwaj
 Aruna Balraj

References

External links

Indian drama films
2020s Kannada-language films
Films shot in Karnataka
2022 drama films
2022 films